Kincaid or Kinkaid is a Scottish surname.

Notable people with the surname include:
Alexander Kincaid (1710–1777), Scottish printer and publisher who served as Lord Provost of Edinburgh
Angela Kincaid, British children's book illustrator
April Kincaid (born 1976), American professional wrestler and model
Aron Kincaid (1940–2011), American voice actor
Bradley Kincaid (1895–1989), American folk singer and radio entertainer
Charles Augustus Kincaid (1870–1954), co-author of The History of the Maratha People
Cliff Kincaid (born 1954), American investigative journalist
Dalton Kincaid (born 1999), American football player
Dave Kincaid (born 1957), Irish-American singer, musician and songwriter who co-founded the Brandos.
Doug Kincaid (born 1962), American puppeteer
D. Lawrence Kincaid (born 1945), social scientist and proponent of the Convergence Model of Communication
Harrison R. Kincaid (1836–1920), American politician
Hilda Kincaid (1886–1967), Australian medical practitioner
Jamaica Kincaid (born 1949), Antiguan-American novelist
James R. Kincaid, American author
Sir John Kincaid (1787 – 1862) was an officer of the British 95th Regiment who wrote a first hand account of his service.
John G. Kincaid, cofounder of the former British marine engine manufacturer John G. Kincaid & Company
J. Peter Kincaid (born 1942), American scientist and educator
Keith Kinkaid (born 1989), American ice hockey player
Lloyd H. Kincaid (1925–2007), American politician
Matt Kincaid, Northern Irish paramilitary leader
Nanci Kincaid, American novelist
Robert Kincaid (1832–1920), Ontario politician
Thomas Kincaid (1661–1726), Scottish diarist, golfer and archer
Thomas C. Kinkaid (1888–1972), American admiral
Tim Kincaid (born 1944), American pornographic film director
Trevor Kincaid (1872–1970), Canadian-American biologist
Wally Kincaid (1926–2015), American basketball coach
William Kincaid (artist) (born 1957), American painter
William Kincaid (flutist) (1895–1967), American flutist
William W. Kincaid (1868–1940s), American businessman

Fictional characters with the surname include:
Billy Kincaid, a supervillain from Spawn comic series
Chet Kincaid, from the TV show The Bill Cosby Show, portrayed by Bill Cosby
Claire Kincaid, an Assistant District Attorney in Law & Order, played by Jill Hennessy
Darius Kincaid, from the movie "The Hitman's Bodyguard”, played by Samuel L. Jackson
Jared Kincaid, from The Dresden Files book series
Keith Kincaid, from the movie Bowfinger, portrayed by Eddie Murphy
Liam Kincaid, from the TV show Earth: Final Conflict
Paul Kincaid, US President from the TV series Hostages, portrayed by James Naughton
Reuben Kincaid, from the TV show The Partridge Family
Roland Kincaid, from the movie A Nightmare on Elm Street 3: Dream Warriors
Marcus Kincaid, from the game Borderlands
Mr. Kincaid, from the game Pokémon Ranger: Shadows of Almia
Claudia Kincaid and Jamie Kincaid

See also
Kinkade
Kinkaid

References

Surnames of Scottish origin